Kavundampalayam is a legislative assembly constituency in the Indian state of Tamil Nadu. Its State Assembly Constituency number is 117. It comprises the municipality of Kavundampalayam and its surrounding areas in Coimbatore. It was formed in 2009 and is part of the Coimbatore parliamentary constituency. It was created by the bifurcation of the Thondamuthur assembly constituency. It is one of the 234 State Legislative Assembly Constituencies in Tamil Nadu in India.

Kavundampalayam is an area located in Coimbatore, Tamil Nadu, India. Kavundampalayam is along Mettupalayam road in Coimbatore, one of the arterial roads of the city.

Demographics

Kavundampalayam has a population of 46,984. Males constitute 51% of the population, and females 49%. Kavundampalayam has an average literacy rate of 76%, higher than the national average of 59.5%. Male literacy is 81%, and female literacy is 72%. In Kavundampalayam, 11% of the population is under 6 years of age.

Members of the Legislative Assembly

Election Results

2021

2016

2011

References

External links 
 

Assembly constituencies of Tamil Nadu